What Rhymes with Cars and Girls is the debut studio album by You Am I frontman Tim Rogers, and also the name of the stage musical created by Rogers and playwright Aidan Fennessy in 2015.

The album was recorded at Jen Anderson's (of Weddings Parties Anything) home studio, and featured many varied musicians, including Sally Dastey of Tiddas (on "Up-A-Ways").

At the ARIA Music Awards of 1999, Rogers won ARIA Award for Best Male Artist for this release.

Singles
"You've Been So Good to Me So Far" and "I Left My Heart All Over the Place" were released as a double-sided radio single.

Track listing
"Bushell and a Peck" – 2:08
"You've Been So Good to Me So Far" – 4:40
"I Left My Heart All Over the Place" – 4:11
"You Just Don't Do It for Me, Friend" – 3:36
"Arse Kickin' Lady from the Northwest" – 2:56
"Happy Anniversary" – 3:51
"Twenty Eight" – 3:28
"Under the Flight Path" – 3:10
"Up-A-Ways" – 3:16
"Hi, We're the Support Band" – 2:47
"The Songs They Played as I Drove Away" – 4:45

All songs were written by Rogers. "Arse Kickin' Lady from the Northwest" and "Under the Flight Path" both appeared previously as You Am I songs on the "Rumble" single, with the former also appearing as the first track on the live ...Saturday Night, 'Round Ten album.

Personnel
Tim Rogers – vocals, guitar, keyboards
Jen Anderson – violin, viola, harmonium, omnichord
Stuart Speed – upright bass
Ian Kitney – drums and percussion
Mark Wallace – accordion
Ed Bates – pedal steel
Peter Somerville – banjo
Richard Gillard – electric guitar
Ben Hoddanger – trombone
Andy Reid – clarinet and washboard
Jeff Burston – mandolin
Sally Dastey – vocals (on "Up-A-Ways"), brandy
David Lane – guitar

Charts

Musical
In 2015, the album was adapted for the stage, with playwright Aidan Fennessy working with Rogers to create a new musical, What Rhymes with Cars and Girls, for the Melbourne Theatre Company.

Awards
The musical was nominated for a Helpmann Award for Best New Australian Work in 2015.

References

External links

1999 albums
ARIA Award-winning albums
Tim Rogers albums